Wendover is a town in Buckinghamshire, England.

Wendover may also refer to:

Places

Canada
Wendover, Ontario
Saint-Cyrille-de-Wendover, Quebec

United States
Wendover, Utah
West Wendover, Nevada
Wendover Nugget, a casino in West Wendover
Peppermill Wendover, a casino in West Wendover

People
Roger of Wendover (died 1236), English chronicler
John Wendover, 14th-century Archdeacon of Lewes
Peter H. Wendover (1768–1834), United States Representative from New York
Stephen H. Wendover (1831–1889), New York State senator

Transportation
Wendover Air Force Base, a former air base in Utah 
Wendover Airport, Utah
Wendover Arm Canal, England
Wendover Cut-off, a highway in Utah
Wendover railway station, England

Other
Wendover (Hyden, Kentucky), a log building and U.S. national historic landmark
Wendover (UK Parliament constituency)
Wendover Avenue (Greensboro) in Greensboro, North Carolina
Wendover Productions, an educational YouTube channel
Wendover Will, a sign in West Wendover, Nevada
Wendover Woods, in the Chiltern Hills, England